Chichpalli railway station (station code: CIP) is a railway station serving Chichpalli village in Chandrapur district in Maharashtra state in India. It is under Nagpur SEC railway division of South East Central Railway Zone of Indian Railways. It is located on Gondia–Nagbhid–Balharshah line of Indian Railways.

It is located at 250 m above sea level and has no platforms. As of 2018, 2 trains stop at this station.

History
The –Nagbhir– line was opened for traffic in 1908. The Nagbhir–Rajoli line was opened in 1913 and extended up to Chanda Fort. Work for conversion to  broad gauge of the  narrow-gauge Gondia–Chanda Fort line started in December 1992. The fourth phase covering Nagbhir–Chanda Fort section was opened on 13 January 1999 and the Chanda Fort–Balharshah section was opened from 2 July 1999.

References

External links
 Arrivals at Chichpalli India Rail Info

Railway stations in Chandrapur district
Nagpur SEC railway division